W Cephei is a spectroscopic binary and variable star located in the constellation Cepheus.  It is thought to be a member of the Cep OB1 stellar association at about 8,000 light years. The supergiant primary star is one of the largest known stars and as well as one of the most luminous red supergiants.

Discovery
W Cephei was catalogued as BD+57°2568 in the Bonner Durchmusterung published in 1903, and HD 214369 in the Henry Draper Catalogue.  It reported in 1896 as a red star varying from magnitude 7.3 to 8.3.  

In 1925, W Cep was included in a listing of Be stars.  It was recognised as a cool star with spectral type Mep.  It was classified as K0ep Ia from a 1949 spectrum, but also recognised to have a small hot companion, plus an unusual infrared excess.  Ultraviolet spectra allowed absorption lines from the companion to be studied and it was given a spectral type of B0-1.

System
The W Cephei system contains a luminous red supergiant star with a non-supergiant early B companion. The star has unusual emission lines including both permitted and forbidden FeII, produced by a circumstellar envelope containing dust and ionised gas.  The two components have been resolved at  using speckle interferometry.  An orbital period of 2,090 days has been proposed.

Variability
W Cephei varies in brightness from 7th to 9th magnitude.  The General Catalogue of Variable Stars lists it as a semiregular variable with a period of 370 days, but later attempts to find a period have shown only random variations.  It has also been proposed that eclipses occur.

References

External links 
AAVSO chart of comparison stars for W Cephei 
British Astronomical Association VSS light curves

Cephei, W
Cepheus (constellation)
Spectroscopic binaries
Emission-line stars
K-type supergiants
M-type supergiants
B-type main-sequence stars
Semiregular variable stars
BD+57 2568
214369
111592